Tamahagane (玉鋼) is a type of steel made in the Japanese tradition. The word tama means "precious". The word hagane means "steel". Tamahagane is used to make Japanese swords, knives, and other kinds of tools.

The carbon content of the majority of analyzed Japanese swords historically lies between 0.5–0.7 mass%; however, the range extends up to 1.5%.

Production
Tamahagane is made of an iron sand (satetsu) found in Shimane, Japan. There are two main types of iron sands: akame satetsu (赤目砂鉄) and masa satetsu (真砂砂鉄). Akame is lower quality, masa is better quality. The 'murage' decides the amount of the mixing parts. Depending on the desired result, the murage mixes one or more types of sands.

The iron sand is put in a tatara, a clay tub furnace. The tub is dried and heated to about 1,000 °C (1800  °F). Then, it is mixed with charcoal to add carbon to the steel so it can be hardened.

The process of making tamahagane continues for 36-72 hours (a day and a half to three days), depending on how many people work and how much metal is to be obtained. Within an hour of smelting, the iron sand sinks to the bottom, called the bed of fire, in which it will be assessed by color on whether it became Tamahagane. The iron sand is added every ten minutes, and the mixture is frequently turned over.
After the tamahagane is finished, the clay tub is broken and the steel is removed. The best steel is on the edges of metal block; in this area, the oxidation process is stronger. The quality of tamahagane is determined by its color: bright silver pieces are very good for making blades.

See also
Bloomery
Bulat steel
Crucible steel
Damascus steel
Japanese swordsmithing
Katana
Noric steel
Toledo steel
Wootz steel

References

Steels
Japanese swords